Yi Dexin (born 3 December 1960) is a Chinese judoka. He competed in the men's lightweight event at the 1984 Summer Olympics.

References

1960 births
Living people
Chinese male judoka
Olympic judoka of China
Judoka at the 1984 Summer Olympics
Place of birth missing (living people)
20th-century Chinese people